The 2011 UCI BMX World Championships took place in Copenhagen in Denmark and crowned world champions in the cycling discipline of BMX.

Medal summary

Medal table

External links
Official event website
Union Cycliste Internationale website

UCI BMX World Championships
UCI BMX World Championships
2011 in Danish sport